The Lapua railway station is located in the central urban area of the town of Lapua, Finland. It is located along the Seinäjoki–Oulu railway, and its neighboring stations are Kauhava in the north and Seinäjoki in the south.

Services 
Lapua is served by most long-distance trains (InterCity and Pendolino) that use the Seinäjoki–Oulu line as part of their route. In addition, the night trains between Helsinki and Kolari stop at Lapua. All trains arriving to and departing from the station use track 1.

External links

References 

Lapua
Railway stations in South Ostrobothnia